This is a list of purchases of territory by a sovereign nation from another sovereign nation.

References 

Diplomacy-related lists
Treaties involving territorial changes